Waterway Point is a suburban shopping mall located in the town centre of Punggol New Town, Singapore, next to Punggol MRT/LRT station. The mall was built as part of Punggol's first integrated waterfront residential and retail development, Watertown. It is the first mall in Singapore to be integrated with a town square and a visitors’ centre which provides an avenue for residents and the public to learn more about the heritage of Punggol through exhibitions and civic and community events. The mall had a soft launch on 18 January 2016, and was officially opened on 19 April that year.

History

Waterway Point was announced on 25 October 2011 by mall developer Frasers Centerpoint Limited. Built on an empty plot of land located beside the waterway and MRT station, the mall was jointly developed by Far East Organization and Sekisui House and is part of the S$1.6 billion new Watertown development.

Facilities

Located beside the Punggol Waterway, Waterway Point provides various dining, fashion, entertainment and amenities for the suburban residents in the vicinity. The layout of the mall is different from many traditional mall layouts, it is separated into an East Wing and West Wing which are connected by a 24-hour walkway, The Boardwalk, linking Punggol Waterway Park with the mall and Punggol MRT/LRT Station. It also features indoor and outdoor themed spaces located throughout the mall for exhibitions, civic events and recreational activities.

The mall has various educational learning centres, bookstores and play space for children, including a dry and wet playground on the second floor. It also has a 24-hour supermarket, telecommunication shops, as well as salons and banks. It also houses the first and largest suburban basement cinema in Singapore. In 2022, the Toys R Us at Waterway Point is moved from Basement 1 to level 2 in order to make way for Donki Donki

Accessibility
Waterway Point is located beside Punggol MRT/LRT station and Punggol Temporary Bus Interchange. It serves as the main shopping mall for residents of Punggol New Town.

Gallery

See also
Punggol Plaza
Oasis Terraces

References

External links
Waterway Point website
Far East Organisation website

Punggol
Shopping malls in Singapore
Shopping malls established in 2016
Tourist attractions in North-East Region, Singapore
2016 establishments in Singapore